Groveland Township is located in Tazewell County, Illinois. As of the 2010 census, its population was 19,526 and it contained 8,441 housing units.

Geography

Demographics

References

External links
 US Census
 Illinois State Archives

Townships in Tazewell County, Illinois
Peoria metropolitan area, Illinois
Townships in Illinois